Somerset County Cricket Club competed in four competitions in the 1979 season: the first-class County Championship; and three limited overs competitions — the Gillette Cup, the John Player League and the Benson & Hedges Cup. The county fared well in the limited-overs competitions, winning both the Gillette Cup and the John Player League (the first two trophies ever won by the club), but were ejected from the Benson & Hedges Cup when the TCCB ruled they had brought the game into disrepute after a declaration during a match against Worcestershire.

Squad
The following players made at least one appearance for Somerset in First-class or List A cricket in 1979. Age given is at the start of Somerset's first match of the season (29 April 1979).

County Championship

Season standings
Note: Pld = Played, W = Wins, L = Losses, D = Draws, A = Abandonments, Bat = Batting points, Bwl = Bowling points, Pts = Points.

Match log

Batting averages

Source: CricketArchive

Bowling averages

Source: CricketArchive

Other first-class matches

Match log

Gillette Cup

Match log

Batting averages

Source: CricketArchive

Bowling averages

Source: CricketArchive

John Player League

Season standings
Note: Pld = Played, W = Wins, L = Losses, NR = No result, A = Abandonments, Pts = Points, RR = Run rate.

Match log

Batting averages

Source: CricketArchive

Bowling averages

Source: CricketArchive

Benson & Hedges Cup

Season standings
Note: Pld = Played, W = Wins, L = Losses, NR = No result, Pts = Points, BowSR = Bowling strike rate.

Match log

Batting averages

Source: CricketArchive

Bowling averages

Source: CricketArchive

Statistics

Batting

Bowling

Fielding

Wicket-keeping

References

1979 in English cricket
Somerset County Cricket Club seasons